Salem Mekuria (born 1947) is an Ethiopian-born independent filmmaker, video artist and educator living in the United States.

Life and work
Mekuria was born in Addis Ababa. She was educated there and in Axum, and moved to the United States in 1967 where she studied political science and journalism at Macalester College. Mekuria earned a MA in education technology and media production from San Francisco State University in 1978. She later worked at the WGBH TV station  in Boston, starting as a secretary but eventually becoming a producer for the Nova series. Mekuria is the Luella LaMer Professor of Women's Studies in the Art department at Wellesley College.

She writes, produces and directs films and video installations related to Ethiopia. Her work has appeared at the 50th Venice Biennale, the CinemAfrica Film Festival in Sweden, the Museum of Fine Arts, Boston, the National Museum of African Art of the Smithsonian Institution, documenta 11 in Berlin and the New York African Film Festival in New York City.

Works

Films 
 Our Place In The Sun (1988)
 As I Remember It: Portrait of Dorothy West (1991)
 Sidet: Forced Exile (1991) – documentary
 Ye Wonz Maibel (Deluge) (1997)

Video installations
 Ruptures: A Many-Sided Story, Venice Biennale (2003)
 Imagining Tobia (2006-2007)
 Square stories, Addis Ababa (2010)

Awards

Fellowships
Fellowship from the Radcliffe Institute for Advanced Study
New England Media Fellowship
1991: Massachusetts Artists Foundation Award
1991–1992: Fellowship from the Bunting Institute at Radcliffe College
1993: Lila Wallace-Reader's Digest International Artist Residency Fellowship
1995: Rockefeller Foundation Intercultural Media Fellowship
2003–2004: Fulbright Scholar

Film awards
1991: Juror's Citation, Black Maria Film & Video Festival.
1993: Sidet: Forced Exile received a Silver Apple at the National Educational Film and Video Festival
Sidet: Forced Exile received  first place in the National Black Programming Consortium's Prized Pieces and Outstanding Independent film at the New England Film & Video Festival
1997: Director's Citation, Black Maria Film & Video Festival.
Our Place In The Sun was nominated for an Emmy Award
Ye Wonz Maibel (Deluge) received first place in the National Black Programming Consortium's Prized Pieces

References

External links 

1947 births
Living people
People from Addis Ababa
Macalester College alumni
San Francisco State University alumni
Wellesley College faculty
Ethiopian emigrants to the United States
Ethiopian film directors
Ethiopian film producers
Ethiopian screenwriters